R199 may refer to:
 Mercedes-Benz SLR McLaren, a car
 R199 road (Ireland), a regional road in Ireland